P.Y.T. was an American girl group from Florida that formed in 1998 and parted in 2002.

Formation
P.Y.T.'s was formed by four Tampa teenagers - Ashley Niven, Lauren Mayhew, Lydia Bell, and Tracy Williams - who had all been childhood friends. They had previously performed together in the Tampa Bay's Entertainment Revue (through Busch Gardens). The band formed, as Glory, to enter a contest in Teen People magazine. They recorded a demo which instead of entering in the contest made its way to Dave McPherson of Epic Records who signed them to a record contract in 1999.  The band was renamed P.Y.T., the name coming from the Michael Jackson song "P.Y.T. (Pretty Young Thing)," though on some occasions the girls used the acronym "P.Y.T." to stand for the slogan "Prove Yourself True." Among the members of the group, Tracy Williams was the alto and sang lower harmonies, Lauren Mayhew and Ashley Niven were mezzo-sopranos and sang the melody line, and Lydia Bell was the soprano who sang higher harmonies. Ashley Niven was the lead vocalist on the tracks on the album PYT (Down With Me).

Career
PYT toured with 'N Sync, Britney Spears and Destiny's Child and 98 Degrees and performed at the 2001 Super Bowl pre-game show. They had their music used in the films Center Stage and Miss Congeniality (Anywhere USA (song)) and on the TV soap opera Guiding Light. They released their delayed debut album PYT (Down With Me) in the middle of 2001.

From bubblegum pop to urban influence

 
P.Y.T.'s first single was originally planned to be the catchy, pop-inspired ballad "Something More Beautiful," showcasing the vocal talent and harmonization of the group. However, the single was soon switched to match the trends of the quickly-changing music market from a sugary pop piece to a mid-tempo track with an urban flair, the R&B-tinged "Down With Me," featuring mostly the vocals of Ashley Niven, who would go on to sing lead on most future PYT tracks. Though not credited, the members of P.Y.T. appeared as friends of fellow pop singer Mandy Moore in her music video "Candy." To promote their new single and forthcoming album, P.Y.T. toured with the likes of *NSYNC and Britney Spears, but not even a flashy music video for "Down With Me" was enough. The single was switched yet again, this time to the "Same Ol' Same Ol'". A remix version of the song that featured a bassline reminiscent of Dr. Dre and Snoop Dogg was released with a video, which premiered on Nickelodeon. P.Y.T. continued to tour with popular pop gigs 98 Degrees and Destiny's Child before finally releasing their debut album "PYT (Down With Me)" in August 2001. Soon after, P.Y.T. was dropped from Epic, and due to this as well as disagreements between members of the group, the girls went their separate ways, and P.Y.T. was disbanded. 
 
A number of other "bubblegum pop" songs left over from the era of "Something More Beautiful," featuring fairly equal shares of vocals by all four group members, were never officially released as they did not match the urban style of the "PYT (Down With Me)" album. A few of those songs were re-recorded and used by girl group Huckapoo in 2006.

Disbanding
The band was released by their record company in early 2002. After considering finding a new label the band disbanded soon after.

Groupmates Lauren Mayhew and Lydia Bell formed a new group called Turning Point. Even after adding more members, the group fell apart. Mayhew decided to focus on acting and went on to host The N's teen version of Access Hollywood -- Real Access. She has since had guest roles on television programs such as Joan of Arcadia and American Dreams. In films, Mayhew portrayed the role of Robin in the film Raise Your Voice starring Hilary Duff, and Arianna in American Pie: Band Camp. She was the Ring Announcer from the World Wrestling Entertainment's ECW brand. Tracy Williams formed the all-girl trio UC3, which has played throughout the United States and performed for US troops overseas.

Discography
Studio albums
 PYT (Down with Me) (June 19, 2001)

Singles
 "Something More Beautiful" (1999)
 "PYT (Down with Me)" (2000)
 "Same Ol' Same Ol'" (remix) feat. Sarai (2001)

Soundtracks
We’re Dancing and A Girl Can Dream in Center Stage (2000)
Anywhere USA in Bring It On and Miss Congeniality (2000)
Same Ol' Same Ol''' in the video game Project Gotham Racing (2001)

References

External links
PYT profile at HipOnLine.comLiving the teen dream (July 4, 1999) - Article in the Tampa Bay Times'' from when the girls were about 13 years old.

Musical groups established in 1999
Musical groups disestablished in 2002
American pop music groups
American pop girl groups
Musical groups from Tampa, Florida
1999 establishments in Florida